Paramount Network is an American basic cable television channel.

Paramount Network may also refer to:
 Paramount Network (international), a brand of international channels that were previously known as Paramount Channel, and are currently broadcast in some countries in Latin America, in Europe and in Asia-Pacific.
 Paramount Television Network, a short-lived ad-hoc television network operated by Paramount from 1948 to 1956
 Paramount Television Service, a proposed but unrealized network which was scheduled to launch in 1978
 United Paramount Network, which operated from 1995 to 2006 (and which briefly planned a name change to Paramount Network in 2000)
 Paramount Network (Spain), a Spanish version of Paramount Network launched in June 2018 that was originally the first incarnation of the Paramount Channel
 Paramount Network (UK), the British equivalent of Paramount Network which launched in July 2018